Nuages (Live at Yoshi's, vol. 2) is a live album by jazz guitarist Joe Pass that was released in 1997.

Reception

Writing for Allmusic, music critic Richard S. Ginell wrote "Far from being a casual collection of rejects, there is plenty of mellow gold from Joe Pass on this posthumously released second volume from what must have been a memorable gig at this Oakland, California night spot."

Track listing

Personnel
 Joe Pass – guitar
 John Pisano – acoustic guitar, electric guitar
 Monty Budwig – bass
 Colin Bailey – drums

Production & other 
 Eric Miller – producer
 David Luke – engineer, mixing
 Andrew Niedzwiecki – assistant engineer
 George Horn – mastering
 Dan Ouellette – liner notes
 Jamie Putnam – art direction
 Gilles Margerin – design
 Takao Miyakaka – photography

References

Joe Pass live albums
1997 live albums